The 2008 Larry H. Miller Dealerships Utah Grand Prix was the fourth round of the 2008 American Le Mans Series season.  It took place at Miller Motorsports Park, Utah on May 18, 2008.

Race results
Class winners in bold.  Cars failing to complete 70% of winner's distance marked as Not Classified (NC).

† - #1 Audi Sport North America was docked three championship points for an avoidable on-track incident.

‡ - #87 Farnbacher-Loles Motorsports was disqualified after failing post-race technical inspection.  The car's fuel cell was too large.

Statistics
 Pole Position - #7 Penske Racing - 1:31.050
 Fastest Lap - #66 de Ferran Motorsport - 1:32.816

References

Utah
Utah Grand Prix